Lansingburgh Village Burial Ground is a historic cemetery located in the Lansingburgh section of Troy in Rensselaer County, New York.  It was founded in 1771 and contains approximately 350 graves dating to 1912.  It contains a number of notable sandstone, marble, and granite markers that offer a complete catalog of gravestone art from the late 18th through the 19th century.

It was listed on the National Register of Historic Places in 2002.

References

External links
 

Cemeteries on the National Register of Historic Places in New York (state)
1771 establishments in the Province of New York
Cemeteries in Rensselaer County, New York
National Register of Historic Places in Troy, New York